Catalina Saavedra Pérez (born 8 January 1968) is a Chilean film, stage and television actress. She is known to international audiences for playing the title character in the 2009 film The Maid, for which she received several awards and nominations.

Career 
Saavedra's father is the writer Omar Saavedra Santis. She started acting lessons at the age of ten, prompted by her mother's hiring of a private theater arts teacher in Valparaíso. Years later, her love for acting led her to deepen her studies at the "Escuela de Teatro Imagen" in Santiago and later in Barcelona, when she began to study experimental theatre.

Saavedra's first professional theatre performances were in roles in plays such as El Despertar (1991–1997), Pervertimientos y Otros Gestos Para Nada (1993) and La noche de la Iguana (The Night of the Iguana) (1994), and in a café-chantant called TV cable 90 (1992). On film, Saavedra's first appearances were in short films, such as El Bidón and Volando Voy (directed by Miguel Littín). Saavedra has performed various roles in several soap operas, sitcoms and TV shows on Chilean and German television.

International recognition for Saavedra came in 2009, for her leading role as Raquel in the 2009 Chilean film The Maid (2009 film). It was released on 13 August 2009 in Chile and 16 October 2009 in the United States, grossing over $400,000 in the first few weeks in theaters with only 18 copies circulating, turning into one of the most successful Chilean films in the United States. The film ended its theatrical run in the United States with a gross of $576,608. Her role was praised by specialized press and critics around the world, bestowing her many acting awards, including Best Actress at the Sundance Film Festival, Torino Film Festival, Huelva Film Festival, Biarritz Film Festival, Cartagena Film Festival and Miami Film Festival, a breakthrough award at the Gotham Independent Film Awards and a Satellite Awards nomination. In late 2009, she appeared as a possible nominee for the most important film awards, Academy Awards and Golden Globes Awards along with the film The Maid for International Movie.

Filmography

Awards and nominations

Theatre

Film

Work in TV and stage

Television credits (sitcoms and series) 

 Jaguar Yu (1992)
Amor a domicilio, la comedia (1996) as Brígida
 Geografía del deseo (2004), as Marisa
Los Galindo (2005), season 1, episode 1
Loco por ti (2005), season 4, episode 2
Los simuladores (2005), season 1, episodes 1, 3, 4 and 8
La Nany (2005), season 1, episodes 8 and 76
La otra cara del espejo (2006), season 1, episode 1
Urgencias (2006), season 2, episode 9
Huaiquimán y Tolosa (2006), season 1, episode 8
 Los Venegas (2006–2011) as Josefina

 Television credits (soap operas) Hasta en las mejores familias (1994) as JessicaAmor a Domicilio (1995) as BrígidaAdrenalina (1996) as Raquel TrujilloPlaya Salvaje (1997) as SusanaFuera de Control (1999) as Pamela DuarteSabor a Ti (2000) as Virginia SolanoPiel Canela (2001) as Talula VargasBuen Partido (2002) as RitaFortunato (2007), as Dulcinea

 Stage credits 

 El Despertar (1991–1997)
 Pervertimientos y Otros Gestos Para Nada (1993)
 La noche de la Iguana (1994)
 Muerte de un Funcionario Público (1995)
 Telarañas (1996, 1998)
 Sht (2000)
 Ojos Rotos (2001–2002) (performed in Chile and at the International Hispanic Theatre Festival of Miami)
 Firmas para el Amor (2001–2002), Assistant director
 Circulando (2003)
 Ni Ahí (2004)
 Inocencia (2004)
 En La Sangre (2004)
 Putas Errantes (2005–2006)
 El lugar de la misericordia (2006), Assistant director
 Las Gallinas (2007)
 Las Brutas (2007) (performed in Chile and in a Tour to Europe)
 Los Mountainbikers (2008)
 Diatriba de la victoria (2009)
 Equívoca Fuga de Señorita Apretando un Pañuelo de encaje sobre su Pecho'' (2009)

References

External links 

1968 births
Chilean stage actresses
Chilean film actresses
Living people
People from Valparaíso
Chilean telenovela actresses
Chilean television actresses